Lena Werner (born 8 October 1994) is a German politician of the Social Democratic Party (SPD) who has been serving as a member of the Bundestag since 2021.

Early life and education
Werner was born 1994 in Trier where she completed her training in event management. From 2020, she worked at the German Agency for International Cooperation (GIZ).

Political career
Werner became a member of the Bundestag in 2021, representing the Bitburg district. In parliament, she has since been serving on the Committee on Economic Affairs and the Committee on Tourism.

Other activities
 Business Forum of the Social Democratic Party of Germany, Member of the Political Advisory Board (since 2022)

Personal life
Werner shares an apartment with fellow parliamentarians Ye-One Rhie and Brian Nickholz in the Moabit district of Berlin.

References

1994 births
Members of the Bundestag for Rhineland-Palatinate
Living people
Members of the Bundestag 2021–2025
Members of the Bundestag for the Social Democratic Party of Germany